The men's light middleweight event was part of the boxing programme at the 1972 Summer Olympics. The weight class allowed boxers of up to 71 kilograms to compete. The competition was held from 28 August to 10 September 1972. 34 boxers from 34 nations competed.

Medalists

Results
The following boxers took part in the event:

First round
 Rolando Garbey (CUB) def. Ricky Barnor (GHA), 5:0
 Svetomir Belic (YUG) def. Oumar Fall (SEN), 4:1

Second round
 Anthony Richardson (HOL) def. Svetomir Belic (YUG), 3:2
 Loucif Hanmani (ALG) def. José Antonio Colon (PUR), 5:0
 Alan Minter (GBR) def. Reginald Ford (GUY), KO-2
 Valeri Tregubov (URS) def. Reggie Jones (USA), 3:2
Reggie Jones was controversially eliminated in the second round of the light middleweight division (– 71 kg) by Valeri Tregubov of the Soviet Union in a fight he was generally accepted to have won.
 Evengelos Oikonomakos (GRE) def. Nicolas Aquilino (PHI), 5:0
 Dieter Kottysch (FRG) def. Bonifacio Avila (COL), TKO-2
 Mohamed Majeri (TUN) def. Issoufou Habou (NIG), 5:0
 Alan Jenkinson (AUS) def. Michel Belliard (FRA), 4:1
 Mikko Saarinen (FIN) def. David Attan (KEN), TKO-2
 Peter Tiepold (GDR) def. Ion Györfi (ROU), 4:1
 Christopher Elliott (IRL) def. Farouk Kesrouan (LEB), 5:0
 Emeterio Villanueva (MEX) def. Alfredo Lemus (VEN), 4:1
 Wiesław Rudkowski (POL) def. Antonio Castellini (ITA), 5:0
 Nayden Stanchev (BUL) def. John Opio (UGA), 3:2
 Rolando Garbey (CUB) def. Franz Csandl (AUT), 5:0
 Jae Keun-Lim (KOR) def. Namchal Tsendaiush (MGL), 3:2

Third round
 Loucif Hanmani (ALG) def. Anthony Richardson (HOL), TKO-2
 Alan Minter (GBR) def. Valeri Tregubov (URS), 5:0
 Dieter Kottysch (FRG) def. Evengelos Oikonomakos (GRE), 5:0
 Mohamed Majeri (TUN) def. Alan Jenkinson (AUS), 5:0
 Peter Tiepold (GDR) def. Mikko Saarinen (FIN), 5:0
 Emeterio Villanueva (MEX) def. Christopher Elliott (IRL), TKO-3
 Wiesław Rudkowski (POL) def. Nayden Stanchev (BUL), 5:0
 Rolando Garbey (CUB) def. Jae Keun-Lim (KOR), TKO-2

Quarterfinals
 Alan Minter (GBR) def. Loucif Hanmani (ALG), 4:1
 Dieter Kottysch (FRG) def. Mohamed Majeri (TUN), 5:0
 Peter Tiepold (GDR) def. Emeterio Villanueva (MEX), 5:0
 Wiesław Rudkowski (POL) def. Rolando Garbey (CUB), 4:1

Semifinals
 Dieter Kottysch (FRG) def. Alan Minter (GBR), 3:2
 Wiesław Rudkowski (POL) def. Peter Tiepold (GDR), 4:1

Final
 Dieter Kottysch (FRG) def. Wiesław Rudkowski (POL), 3:2

References

Light Middleweight